Delwar Hossain (–24 July 2020) is a Bangladesh Awami League politician and the former Member of Parliament of Faridpur-4.

Career
Delwar Hossain was a freedom fighter. He was elected to parliament from Faridpur-4 as a Bangladesh Awami League candidate in 1973.

He was the principal of Faridpur Yasin College, Madhukhali Government Ain Uddin College, Kaderdi Degree College, Boalmari College and the headmaster of Boalmari George Academy.

Death 
Hossain died on 24 July 2020.

References 

Awami League politicians
1st Jatiya Sangsad members
1930s births
Year of birth uncertain
2020 deaths